Aquarium was a Canadian nature documentary television series which aired on CBC Television in 1974 and rebroadcast in 1975.

Premise
This nature series was recorded at various locations, including the Vancouver Aquarium. It was hosted by Murray Newman, a curator, and Bob Switzer. The focus was on aquatic life, often following Newman's excursions to Australia and the South Pacific, as well as expeditions along Vancouver Island and Vancouver's harbour.

Scheduling
The series aired on Fridays 5:00 p.m. (Eastern) from 5 July to 20 September 1974. It was rebroadcast on Wednesdays at the same time of day from 9 July to 3 September 1975.

References

External links
 

CBC Television original programming
1974 Canadian television series debuts
1974 Canadian television series endings
Television shows filmed in Vancouver